Cordun is a commune in Neamț County, Western Moldavia, Romania. It is composed of three villages: Cordun, Pildești and Simionești.

In 2002, the commune had a population of 7174, of whom all but seven were ethnic Romanians. 52.8% of residents were Roman Catholic and 46.6% Romanian Orthodox.

References

Communes in Neamț County
Localities in Western Moldavia